Richard D. James Album is the eponymous fourth studio album by British electronic musician Richard D. James, under his pseudonym Aphex Twin. In the United Kingdom, the album was released on 4 November 1996 through Warp. In the United States, it was released on 28 January 1997 by Sire Records, with the Girl/Boy EP included as bonus tracks. A reissue on vinyl was released on 18 September 2012.

Richard D. James Album was composed by James on his Macintosh computer, and took longer to complete than his previous efforts. The album features faster breakbeats and intricate drum programming which draw influence from jungle and drum and bass, combined with lush string arrangements, unstable time signatures, and slow ambient melodies reminiscent of James' earlier work, as well as modulated vocals by James.

Richard D. James Album was less successful in the United Kingdom than James' two previous albums Selected Ambient Works Volume II (1994) and ...I Care Because You Do (1995). However, the album still charted in the UK, peaking at number 62 on the UK Albums Chart for one week. It also peaked at number 20 in the US Top Heatseekers list, becoming James' first to do so. The album received acclaim from music critics, and NME listed it as the 20th best album of the year.

Background and production
In 1995, Richard James released the two Hangable Auto Bulb EPs under his AFX moniker, experimenting with exaggerated rhythms inspired by drum and bass in a style that came to be called "drill 'n' bass". In the following year, James released the Aphex Twin EP Girl/Boy. This faster style of drum programming was inspired by James' friend Luke Vibert, who recorded in this style as Plug. James stated that while he worked with triplets and complicated beats in the past, that Vibert "got me into doing it a faster pace. He gave me the spark to do it faster, but now I'm trying to take it to all extremes". James also noted the influence of his friend Tom Jenkinson (aka Squarepusher). He had said Jenkinson and Vibert were the "only two people around who are [musically] consistent enough for me".

James has stated that most of the album was composed on his Macintosh computer and that the album took longer to create than any of his previous albums. Describing his approach to drum programming, he stated that "sometimes I just hit the keyboard in a way I'd like the rhythm of the tracks to sound. Then I'll spend four hours moving all the notes where I want them to go." Some tracks on the album include James' vocals modulated on a computer; in "To Cure a Weakling Child", James manipulated his voice to sound like a child giving a lecture about arms and legs. For the orchestral arrangements on the album, James bought a violin at a car boot sale. He taught himself to play a note from the instrument by placing it on a table, playing a note and sampling it for the album. Two of the tracks, "Fingerbib" and "Logan Rock Witch", had previously been intended for another album James had been working on around the same period, entitled Melodies from Mars, which remains officially unreleased.

The cover art for Richard D. James Album is credited to both James and Johnny Clayton. Clayton did not accept credit for the album's cover, stating that he taught James how to use Photoshop and "he started playing around with his own self-image. That's what led to that cover."

Composition

Richard D. James Album is a work of electronica that has been characterised as James's "swan dive into jungle and drill'n'bass" by Vice, and labeled as a work of IDM by Pitchfork, working with jungle, drum and bass and ambient and acid techno in some tracks. PopMatters noted that '[w]hat makes Richard D. James Album stand out among James’ previous works is the synthesis of delicate, symphonic sounds and hard, jackhammering beats," noting that the album consolidated his 1995 entry into the short-lived drill 'n' bass subgenre. James has claimed the influence of jungle music came from "any of the drum 'n' bass and breakbeat artists" and that he has "always been into nicking other things [...] and making something different". Stereogum noted the album heavily relies on drum programming, sampling, and "other digital intricacies that would've been otherwise unthinkable without computers". It also features lush string arrangements and simple keyboard textures built over quadruple time breakbeats and unstable time signatures. Steve Taylor found the record Aphex Twin's "most terrifying" one, with "weird stop-start beats, white noise and tough melodies."

John Bush of AllMusic noted that the album continued James's "forays into acid-jungle and experimental music," noting that the album was "more extreme than virtually all jungle being made at the time", with beats layered over slower melodies that characterised James' earlier ambient works. Pitchfork opined that the album was one of the "aggressive combinations of disparate electronic forms", with "almost-brutal contrast between its elements". Exclaim! commented that tracks such as "Girl/Boy Song", "Yellow Calx", and "Peek 824545201" were "loosely based on jungle". Spin linked the album's use of vocals, both sung and sampled, its cover artwork and title, stating that "Richard D. James might be the first electronica LP that not only gropes for narrative but also aspired to an abstract sort of autobiography."

Release
In the United Kingdom, Richard D. James Album was released by Warp on 4 November 1996. The album charted on the UK Albums Chart in the week ending 16 November 1996 for one week, where it peaked at number 62. In the UK, it was less successful than his two previous albums. The American version included the Girl/Boy EP as bonus tracks. It was released on 28 January 1997 by Sire Records. The album was released on compact disc, cassette and gramophone record; early copies of the album were distributed with a plastic sachet containing James' hair. Along with ...I Care Because You Do (1995), Richard D. James Album was reissued on vinyl on 18 September 2012 by record label 1972. Warp announced their own re-issue of the album on 180-gram vinyl for 8 October 2012.

Critical reception

In the United Kingdom, The Independent gave the album a positive review, stating that "The intuitive sense of melody [James] has been striving so hard to suppress over the last few years has come to the fore too, and the result is the most magical pop record of the year: the year in question being AD 2001". In North America, Pitchfork gave the album an 8.4 out of ten rating, stating that "The Richard D. James Album is 43.5 minutes of pure electronic genius" and "just when your brain starts to comprehend a rhythmic pattern, the beat shifts, turns left and crushes your torso under the steering wheel." Rolling Stone gave the album three-and-a-half stars out of five, commenting that "Aphex Twin coaxes great emotional resonance from his machines" and combines "jolting beats, pristine melodic fragments and random noises into elegant – if at times unnerving – futuristic pop". However, he also commented that "not all of Richard D. James goes down easy". Marc Widenbaum of The Pulse called the album, "quite simply, the strongest art-pop record to appear since Laurie Anderson's Mr. Heartbreak", defined by a "series of lovely tunes atop a decisive, rhythmically fascinating girding of rapid-fire, turn-on-a-dime percussion." Entertainment Weekly awarded the album an A−, calling it James' "quirkiest, most personal work" and said that "4" and "Girl/Boy Song" revealed "a new warmth and wistfulness." The Washington Post gave the album a negative review, referring to the music as "sloppy offhand", "a noisy mess" and sounding "like a private joke".

NME placed the album at number 20 on their list of the best albums of 1996. The Wire also listed the album among their top 50 albums of the year for 1996. In 2003, Pitchfork listed their top albums of the 1990s, with Richard D. James Album ranking at 40. Pitchfork stated that RDJ is not "easily dated by [its] technology", and doesn't "sound stale compared to modern variations." Slant Magazine placed the album at number 91 on their list of the top 100 albums of the 1990s, describing it as "more fascinated by textures than almost any other electronic album ever crafted". In 2015, Spin placed the album at number 71 on their list of the best albums of the past 30 years. In the same year, Exclaim! listed Richard D. James Album on their list of Essential Richard D. James albums. The review opined that the album was "not necessarily a release that you immediately fall in love with", but that it was "endlessly rewarding". Evening Standard named it among "the most influential electronica albums of the past 20 years."

The album was placed in numerous end-of-decade lists. According to Acclaimed Music, a site which uses statistics to numerically represent reception among critics, Richard D. James Album is the 766th most celebrated album of all time, as of 2017. It is also James' second most acclaimed album, behind Selected Ambient Works 85–92 (1992). In 2019, Reverb called the album "perhaps the best-known IDM release of all time" and a "highwater mark" for the genre.

Usage in media
Songs from the album were used on several different television ads. "To Cure a Weakling Child" was used in a high-profile UK TV advertising campaign for mobile phone company Orange. The song "4" was used in a US government anti-drug advertisement spot, as well as an advertisement in the United States for the Special Olympics. "Girl/Boy Song" was used in a Bank of America commercial.

Track listing
All tracks are credited as being written and produced by "Me" (Richard D. James).

Personnel
Credits from the back cover of the album.
 Aphex Twin (credited as "Me") – writer, producer, sleeve
 Johnny Clayton – sleeve

Charts

Sales

See also
 1996 in music
 Music of the United Kingdom (1990s)

Footnotes

Notes

Citations

Bibliography

External links
 

1996 albums
Aphex Twin
Aphex Twin albums
Drum and bass albums
Jungle music albums
Art pop albums
Sire Records albums
Warp (record label) albums